The SocioMX Cup is an international soccer tournament played in the United States as part of the SocioMX Tour since 2015 and includes four matches with men's First League Mexican teams. Founded by sports executive Jorge Villalobos, CEO of Sports Marketing Monterrey, SocioMX is a powerful soccer platform that connects the fans with their favorite team through unique live and digital experiences, including the SocioMX Cup. The matches are televised in the US by Univision Deportes and internationally via ESPN in more than twenty-one countries including Mexico and Latin America. Both, the SocioMX Cup and SocioMX Tour are part of the events hosted by SocioMX, a powerful platform that engages soccer fans through: professional matches broadcast on live television, soccer stars, promotions, experiences and digital strategies.

Rules of the Cup 

 Four teams participate
 Teams begin the tournament at the Semifinals; the winners play the Final, while the losers play for the Third Place.
 If teams are tied after 90 minutes, the penalty kicks decide the winner of the match
The matches follow the International friendly game rules stipulated by FIFA for substitutions.

SocioMX Tour 2018-2014 
The SocioMX Tour has different and separate dates from the SocioMX Cup. These matches are classified as international friendly matches by FIFA and can end up in draw or be defined by penalty kicks.

SocioMX has organized the SocioMX Tour hosting different matches per year in different cities of the United States since 2014.

SocioMX Cup 2016 
The 2016 edition was held from July 2 to July 6, 2016 in the cities of San Jose, California, Houston and Dallas in Texas.

Cruz Azul, Pumas, Monterrey y Santos Laguna were part of the Cup. It was the first tournament of Francisco Palencia as a coach with Pumas.

Participating Teams 

  Cruz Azul 
Pumas UNAM
  Monterrey 
  Santos Laguna

Tournament  
{{Round4-with third|July 2 - San José| Santos Laguna|2|Pumas UNAM|1|July 3 - Houston| Cruz Azul|2| Monterrey|1
 |July 6 - Dallas| Santos Laguna|1| Cruz Azul|0
 |July 6 - Dallas|Pumas UNAM|2| Monterrey|0}}

 Semifinals 

 Third Place 

 Final 

 SocioMX Cup 2015 
It was the first edition of the annual tournament between Mexican football teams in United States. This event was played from June 30 to July 5 in the city of Los Angeles (California), Austin and Dallas in Texas.

As in 2016, the competition started in the Semifinals. The winners go to the Final, while teams that vied fell to Third Place.''' In matches were tied after 90 minutes, resorted to penalty kicks to determine the winner.

Participating Teams 

   Cruz Azul
Pumas UNAM
   Monterrey
  Monarcas Morelia

2015 Tournament

Semifinals

Third Place

Final

References

Soccer competitions in the United States